Minuscule 298 (in the Gregory-Aland numbering), ε 1201 (Soden), is a Greek minuscule manuscript of the New Testament, on parchment. Paleographically it has been assigned to the 12th century. 
It has marginalia.

Description 

The codex contains a complete text of the four Gospels on 222 parchment leaves. The text is written in one column per page, in 27-28 lines per page.

There is also another division according to the smaller Ammonian Sections (in Mark 231 – 16:2), whose numbers are given at the margin, (without references to the Eusebian Canons).

Text 

The Greek text of the codex is a representative of the Byzantine text-type. Hermann von Soden included it to the textual family Kx. Aland did not place it in any Category.
According to the Claremont Profile Method it represents the textual family Kx in Luke 1, Luke 10, and Luke 20. It belongs to the cluster 1053.

History 

Formerly the manuscript belonged to the Jesuit's public library in Lyon.

It was added to the list of New Testament manuscripts by Scholz (1794–1852).
It was examined and described by Paulin Martin. C. R. Gregory saw it in 1885.

The manuscript is currently housed at the Bibliothèque nationale de France (Suppl. Gr. 175) at Paris.

See also 

 List of New Testament minuscules
 Biblical manuscript
 Textual criticism

References

Further reading 

 

Greek New Testament minuscules
12th-century biblical manuscripts
Bibliothèque nationale de France collections